Tommy Gallagher (born 10 September 1983) is former a rugby league footballer who played as a  but also appeared as a  or .

Gallagher was born in Dewsbury, and grew up in Birstall.

Gallagher is a product of the Leeds academy, but has had spells with the Hull Kingston Rovers, the Keighley Cougars, the London Broncos, the Widnes (two spells), the Batley Bulldogs (two spells), the Rochdale Hornets and the Swinton Lions before joining the Leigh Centurions in time for the 2012 season. Tommy Gallagher is the elder brother of rugby league footballer John Gallagher.

Gallagher initially ended his playing career in 2015, but came out of retirement for the 2018 season.

References

External links
Leigh Centurions profile

1983 births
Living people
English rugby league players
Rugby league props
Keighley Cougars players
York City Knights players
London Broncos players
Widnes Vikings players
Hull Kingston Rovers players
Batley Bulldogs players
Rochdale Hornets players
Swinton Lions players
Leigh Leopards players
Dewsbury Rams players
Ireland national rugby league team players